Shane Davis is an American comic book artist best known for his work on Superman and Batman for DC Comics.

Career
Shane Davis attended The Kubert School in his hometown of Dover, New Jersey. He entered the comics industry in 2003 at DC Comics by illustrating Robin #110 and a spot illustration in JLA-Z #3. In the following year, he illustrated other DC titles including Nightwing #88 and Wonder Woman #201, as well as the Marvel Comics' book Marvel Halloween Ashcan 2004. In the ensuing years he illustrated a variety of titles for both publishers, such as Marvel Age Spider-Man, Action Comics, and Batman. One of his more notable Batman stories was 2006's Batman Annual #25, which featured the return of Jason Todd. That same year he illustrated Jay Faerber's series, Noble Causes #17, for Image Comics. Davis also drew the miniseries Mystery in Space vol. 2, written by Jim Starlin and featuring Captain Comet.

In 2007, Davis illustrated the first issue of the JLA/JSA crossover storyline "The Lightning Saga", and then became the penciller for Superman/Batman for issues #44–49. In 2008, Davis was tapped by writer Geoff Johns to be the artist for a Final Crisis tie-in one-shot entitled Rage of the Red Lanterns, which featured a lead-up to a story in the main Green Lantern title and its 2009 crossover Blackest Night. Davis' worked with writer J. Michael Straczynski on the Superman: Earth One graphic novel published in 2010. A second volume of Superman: Earth One was released in 2012.

Davis' projects since 2013 include the Shadow Walk graphic novel for Legendary Comics and a Batman story for the Legends of the Dark Knight series. He wrote and drew the lead story in The New Gods Special #1 (2017).

Bibliography

9 Lives Comics
 

Starlight Cats (2021)
Inglorious Rex (2022)

DC Comics
 

Action Comics #821 (among other artists) (2005)
Batman #646, Annual #25 (2005–2006)
Final Crisis: Rage of the Red Lanterns #1 (2008)
Justice League of America vol. 2 #8 (full art); #25 (among other artists) (2007–2008)
Kamandi Challenge #10 (2017)
 Legends of the Dark Knight 100-Page Super Spectacular #3 (2014) 
Mystery in Space vol. 2 #1–5, 7 (2006–2007)
New Gods Special #1 (2017) 
Nightwing #88 (2004)
Robin #110 (2003)
Sideways #12 (2019)
Superman/Batman #44–49, 75 (2008–2010)
Superman: Earth One (2010)
Superman: Earth One – Volume Two (2012)
Superman/Top Cat Special #1 (2018)
Wonder Woman vol. 2 #201 (2004)

Image Comics
 The CBLDF Presents Liberty Annual (one page) (2011)
 Noble Causes: Distant Relatives #2 (2003)

Legendary Comics
 Shadow Walk (2013)

Marvel Comics
Marvel Age Spider-Man #13, 15 (2004–2005)
Spider-Man Team-Up Special (Spider-Man and the Fantastic Four) #1 (2005)

References

External links

Shane Davis at DC Comics
Shane Davis at Mike's Amazing World of Comics

21st-century American artists
American comics artists
American comics writers
American graphic novelists
Artists from New Jersey
Comics inkers
DC Comics people
Living people
People from Dover, New Jersey
Place of birth missing (living people)
Year of birth missing (living people)
The Kubert School alumni